Portrait of a Man is a circa 1470 oil on panel painting by Hans Memling. It is now in the Frick Collection in New York, which it entered in 1968 via the Duveen art dealership.

It was first identified and published as a Memling in 1937. At the time it was in the collection of Joseph baron van der Elst (1896-1971) in Vienna and then in his castle at Oostkerke.

Sources
Till-Holger Borchert, De portretten van Memling (tentoonstelling Brugge 2005), Ludion, 2005 (nummer 2), p. 152.

Frick Collection

1470s paintings
Man
Man

Memling
Man